The Gregorio Crespin House, at 132 E. De Vargas St. in Santa Fe, New Mexico, was listed on the National Register of Historic Places in 1975.  The listing included two contributing buildings.  It has also been known as the Van Stone House.

It is an adobe structure started in the early 1700s.  It consisted "of five rooms and a portal in 1867", and "was enlarged to
twelve rooms by 1914 when the Van Stone family rented the house."

References

National Register of Historic Places in Santa Fe County, New Mexico
Buildings and structures completed in 1740